Roger Manderscheid (1 March 1933, in Itzig – 1 June 2010) was a writer from Luxembourg.  He won the Batty Weber Prize in 1990 for his literary work and the inaugural Servais Prize in 1992 for De Papagei um Käschtebam.

References

External links

Obituary 

1933 births
2010 deaths
People from Hesperange
Luxembourgian novelists
Alumni of the Athénée de Luxembourg
20th-century novelists
Luxembourgian screenwriters
Male screenwriters
Luxembourgian male actors